Matthías Jochumsson (11 November 1835 – 18 November 1920) was an Icelandic Lutheran clergyman, poet, playwright, and translator. He is best known for his lyrical poetry and for writing the national anthem of Iceland,  "Lofsöngur", in 1874.

Life
He was born in Skógar in Þorskafjörður, NW Iceland, into a poor family. He studied theology, was ordained priest and for a number of years served as pastor at Oddi, S Iceland, and later in Akureyri. He also worked as a newspaper editor and schoolteacher. In his religious views, Matthías leaned towards Unitarianism. Matthías made some trips to the continent to further his education.

Intending to become a businessman, Matthías discovered his passion for languages and literature. In addition to his own works, which include many hymns, Matthías was a prolific translator, especially from English and the Scandinavian languages. His translations from Shakespeare include Hamlet, Macbeth, Othello and Romeo and Juliet. 

Matthías's popular comedy, "Skugga-Sveinn", which premiered in 1860, is often hailed as Iceland's first successful performed play.

He wrote "Lofsöngur" with music by Sveinbjörn Sveinbjörnsson in Edinburgh, Scotland in 1874.

He died in Akureyri, where his house, is now a museum, devoted to his life and work. He is buried in Akureyri.

References

External links

 History about national anthem of Iceland

1835 births
1920 deaths
Matthias Jochumsson
Matthias Jochumsson
National anthem writers
Matthias Jochumsson
Lyric poets
19th-century male writers